Svorkmo Power Station  is a hydroelectric power station located in Svorkmo in the municipality of Orkdal in Sør-Trøndelag, Norway.

It has a total installed capacity of 54 MW, with two units equipped with francis turbines, and has an annual production of approximately 270 GWh. The power station utilises the waterfalls between Meldal and Svorkmo in the Orkla river system, with a total head of 99 m.

See also

References

Hydroelectric power stations in Norway
Buildings and structures in Trøndelag
1983 establishments in Norway
Energy infrastructure completed in 1983